Puddling is the tillage of rice paddies while flooded, an ancient practice that is used to prepare for rice cultivation.  Historically, this has been accomplished by dragging a weighted harrow across a flooded paddy field behind a buffalo or ox, and is now accomplished using mechanized approaches, often using a walking tractor.

Puddling reduces the percolation  rates of water by churning the clay particles and making them close many of the soil pores.

References

External links 
BIS specifications for Puddlers

Agricultural terminology
Rice production